Condannato a nozze  (also known as Diary of a Man Condemned to Marriage)  is a 1993 Italian comedy film directed by Giuseppe Piccioni. It entered the Panorama section at the 50th Venice International Film Festival.

Cast 
 Sergio Rubini: Roberto
 Margherita Buy: Sandra
 Valeria Bruni Tedeschi: Gloria 
 Asia Argento: Olivia 
 Patrizia Piccinini: Enrica 
 Patrizia Sacchi:  Psychoanalyst
 Enzo Cannavale: Doorman

Production
During filming, then 17-year-old Asia Argento began a love affair with Sergio Rubini, who at the time was married to Margherita Buy.

See also     
 List of Italian films of 1993

References

External links

Condannato a nozze at Variety Distribution

1993 films
1993 comedy films
Italian comedy films
Films directed by Giuseppe Piccioni
1990s Italian-language films
1990s Italian films